Edouard A. Stackpole (December 7, 1903 – September 2, 1993) was an American journalist, museum curator, whaling historian and writer.

Works

 1931 Smuggler's Luck
 1932 You Fight for Treasure!
 1935 Madagascar Jack
 1937 Privateer Ahoy!
 1939 Mutiny at Midnight
 1946 The Robbery of The Nantucket Bank:  An Island Mystery of 150 Years Ago.  Published by Inquirer and Mirror April, 1946
 1949 Rambling Through the Streets and Lanes of Nantucket
 1950 William Rotch (1734–1828) of Nantucket
 1953 The Sea Hunters
 1954 Captain Prescott and the Opium Smuggle
 1954 The wreck of the Steamer San Francisco
 1955 The Voyage of the Huron and the Huntress
 1958 Dead Man's Gold
 1958 Scrimshaw at Mystic Seaport
 1959 Small Craft at Mystic Seaport
 1962 The Loss of the Essex
 1962 Those in Peril on the Sea
 1963 Nantucket Rebel
 1964 Figureheads & Ship Carvings at Mystic Seaport
 1967 The Charles W. Morgan
 1968 The Old Nantucket Gaol
 1972 Whales & Destiny
 1973 Nantucket in Color
 1974 Nantucket Doorways

References

External link

 1966 book review from The Richmond Times Dispatch

 1966 article from Meriden, Connecticut Journal

1903 births
1993 deaths
20th-century American writers
People from Nantucket, Massachusetts
People from Mystic, Connecticut
Roxbury Latin School alumni
20th-century American male writers